Shahpur is a census town in Betul district in the Indian state of Madhya Pradesh.

Geography
There is a small town named Chopna located 18 KM from Shahpur. In Chopna region 36 Bangali villages. There is a Lord Hanuman temple near Aamdhana.

Demographics
 India census, Shahpur had a population of 3997. Males constitute 53% of the population and females 47%. Shahpur has an average literacy rate of 80%, higher than the national average of 59.5%: male literacy is 85%, and female literacy is 74%. In Shahpur, 11% of the population is under 6 years of age.

References

Cities and towns in Betul district